Belgium was represented at the Eurovision Song Contest 1958, which took place on 12 March in Hilversum, by Fud Leclerc, with the song "Ma petite chatte". The song was chosen at the Belgian preselection entitled Concours Eurovision de la Chanson - Demi-Finale, held on 19 February.

Before Eurovision

Concours Eurovision de la Chanson - Demi-Finale
Concours Eurovision de la Chanson - Demi-Finale was the national final format developed by INR in order to select Belgium's entry for the Eurovision Song Contest 1958. The competition was held on 19 February 1958 at 20:40 CET and broadcast on INR. Ten entries competed and the winner was selected over two rounds of voting. In the first round, audience members exclusively selected the top five entries to proceed to the second round. In the second round, the winner, "Ma petite chatte" performed by Fud Leclerc, was selected through the votes of a jury panel among 5 superfinalists.

At Eurovision
On the night of the final, Wednesday 12 March 1958, Fud Leclerc performed seventh in the running order, following Denmark and preceding Germany.  At the close of voting "Ma Petite Chatte" had received 8 points, placing Belgium join fifth (with Austria) of the 10 entries.

The Belgian entry was conducted at the contest by the musical director Dolf Van Der Linden.

Voting
Every country had a jury of ten people. Every jury member could give one point to his or her favourite song.

References

External links
Belgium: Eurovision Song Contest 1979 - ESCToday.com
Eurovision Song Contest 1958 participants - ESCToday.com
Eurovision Song Contest 1956 participants - ESCToday.com

Countries in the Eurovision Song Contest 1958
1958
Eurovision